Cocalico Bridge can refer to:

Bridges spanning the Cocalico Creek in Lancaster County, Pennsylvania: 
 
 Bucher's Mill Covered Bridge, the Cocalico #2 Bridge
 Keller's Mill Covered Bridge, the Cocalico #5 Bridge
 Zook's Mill Covered Bridge, the Cocalico #7 Bridge